Ross Edwin Hockenhull (born 29 September 1961) is a British former racing driver. He is from Buxton, Derbyshire.
He has three sons. A well liked and respected personality.
Ross took part in three races of the 1989 International Formula 3000 season with an eighth-place best finish at Brands Hatch.

He raced for Cobra Motorsport at Oulton Park in The Gold Cup, starting from the back of the grid  in wet conditions on slick tyres. Ross made progress through the field as a dry line developed on the track, he demonstrated outstanding skill in difficult conditions. As the field dived to the pits to change onto slick tyres Ross, on hot slicks, took on a backmarker on cold slick at Druids, Ross was forced off-line onto the wet track. Ross lost traction and the resulting trip into the scenery ended Ross's race. It was generally accepted that the pace Ross was setting and the laps that remind, he wouldn't have been caught and would have won The Gold Cup. This would have been a fitting piece of silverware  for a driver that had shown great alacrity at such a demanding circuit during his career.

References

1961 births
Living people
English racing drivers
International Formula 3000 drivers